Starcontrol Out is an EP by Three Mile Pilot, released in 1995 by Negative Records.

Track listing

Personnel 
Adapted from the Starcontrol Out liner notes.

Three Mile Pilot
 Pall Jenkins – vocals, guitar, engineering
 Armistead Burwell Smith IV – bass guitar, piano, backing vocals, engineering
 Tom Zinser – drums
Additional musicians
 Jim French – horns

Production and additional personnel
 Tchad Blake – engineering
 Jason Soares – design
 Three Mile Pilot – production, cover art, photography

Release history

References

External links 
 Starcontrol Out at Discogs (list of releases)

1995 EPs
Headhunter Records albums
Three Mile Pilot albums